Northrop Grumman Ship Systems (NGSS) was a former sector or division of Northrop Grumman Corporation which was responsible for building small and medium shipping products.  It was merged with another sector of Northrop Grumman, Northrop Grumman Newport News, which was responsible for building nuclear submarines and supercarriers, to form the sector Northrop Grumman Shipbuilding.

NGSS was headquartered in Pascagoula, Mississippi. It was formed by the union of Ingalls Shipbuilding and Avondale Shipyard companies, reorganized as NGSS Ingalls Operations and NGSS Avondale Operations. NGSS facilities are located in Pascagoula, Gulfport, Mississippi, Bridge City, Louisiana, and Tallulah, Louisiana.

On March 31, 2011, Northrop Grumman spun off its shipbuilding sector (including Ingalls Shipbuilding) into a new corporation, Huntington Ingalls Industries.

Ships
 NGSS repaired the destroyer  after it was damaged in an attack in Yemen.
 NGSS built three s for Israel, based on Israeli designs.

References

External links
 

Northrop Grumman
Defunct manufacturing companies based in Mississippi
Pascagoula, Mississippi